Sanjay Gurung (born 4 May 1969) is a Nepalese cricket umpire. Gurung has umpired seven Twenty20 Internationals.

References

External links 

Living people
1969 births
Nepalese cricket umpires
Cricket umpires
People from Rupandehi District
Nepalese Twenty20 International cricket umpires